Paris-Saclay University is a public research university based in Paris, France. It is one of the 13 prestigious universities that emerged from the division of the University of Paris, also known as the Sorbonne. 

It is part of the Paris-Saclay project, which is a research-intensive academic campus, and is the main center for training and research within the technology cluster of Paris-Saclay. The University integrates several leading grandes écoles, faculties, colleges and research centers that are part of the world's top research organizations in various fields.

Paris-Saclay has achieved particular renown in mathematics. As of 2021, 11 Fields Medalists have been affiliated with the university  and its associated research institutes, which include the Institut des Hautes Études Scientifiques – generally regarded as the birthplace of modern algebraic geometry and catastrophe theory.

History 
In 2019, the Paris-Saclay University succeeded to University of Paris-Sud (Paris XI) founded in 1971, which itself succeeded to University of Paris founded c. 1150.

After World War II, the rapid growth of nuclear physics and chemistry meant that research needed more and more powerful accelerators, which required large areas. The University of Paris, the École Normale Supérieure and the Collège de France looked for space in the south of Paris near Orsay. Later some of the teaching activity of the Faculty of Sciences in Paris was transferred to Orsay in 1956 at the request of Irène Joliot-Curie and Frédéric Joliot-Curie. The rapid increase of students led to the independence of the Orsay Center on March 1, 1965. It became the University of Paris-Sud (Paris XI) in 1971.

Now it hosts a great number of laboratories on its large (236 ha) campus in Paris-Saclay. Many of the top French laboratories are among them especially in particle physics, nuclear physics, astrophysics, atomic physics and molecular physics, condensed matter physics, theoretical physics, electronics, nanoscience and nanotechnology.

The Paris-Saclay University was established in 2015 as a universities community (ComUE) and in 2019 as a university, with the aim to become a top-ranking, research-focused French university. In order to be recognized as an entity of sufficient size and quality, the university regroups some of the top grandes écoles in France with public universities under a single campus on the Saclay plateau. Each member institution will remain independent but share a significant portion of existing and newly invested resources. This follows a model similar to the one adopted by University of Oxford and Cambridge, where each constituent college keeps its independence while being grouped under a 'university'.

The University System's first academic year started in September 2015.

According to Dominique Vernay, chairman of the foundation developing Paris-Saclay, the university aims at a top-ten position in the Academic Ranking of World Universities (ARWU), but "the first goal is to be the top university in continental Europe".

Furthermore, the university aims to contribute to maximizing the economic and business potential of the Paris-Saclay project through research, via university and research spin-offs, as well as industrial research collaboration with established companies.

In January 2020, it replaced University of Paris-Sud (Paris XI) and in 2025, Université de Versailles-Saint-Quentin-en-Yvelines (UVSQ) and Université d'Évry-Val-d'Essonne (UEVE) will merge with it as well.

In June 2020, Paris-Saclay University ranked 14th in Shanghai Ranking's top 1000 universities in the world, and first worldwide for Mathematics by Academic Ranking of World Universities (ARWU) and 9th worldwide for Physics (1st in Europe).

Organisation 
The Paris-Saclay University consists of five faculties in Sciences, Medicine, Pharmacy, Law-Economics-Management, and Sports Sciences; an Engineering school; three technical institutes specialised in scientific and technical subjects in Cachan, Orsay, and Sceaux; and an undergraduate university school.

The University also brings together four grandes écoles: CentraleSupélec, AgroParisTech, ENS Paris-Saclay and the Institut d'Optique Graduate School, with two associate institutions: Versailles Saint-Quentin-en-Yvelines University (UVSQ) and University of Évry Val d'Essonne (UEVE).

It combines resources from the following French universities and grandes écoles, as well as partial resources from various research organizations and the Systematic Paris-Region cluster:

Initially, the community of universities also included five other grandes écoles: École Polytechnique, Télécom Paris, Telecom SudParis, ENSTA Paris and ENSAE Paris. However, due to differences in University set-up, these five grandes écoles  created their own separate university Polytechnic Institute of Paris. This was announced by French President Emmanuel Macron during a speech in Paris-Saclay. Both of these clusters plan to co-operate and they engage in organization of several master's degrees with the Paris-Saclay University.

Faculties and Institutes

Grandes Écoles and graduate schools

Associated universities

Research organizations
The following research organizations have established research centers within the Paris-Saclay University. The resources contributed by these organizations will remain largely independent from other member institutions. Once the University of Paris-Saclay is fully integrated, its research centers are expected to achieve a profile similar to the Jet Propulsion Laboratory of Caltech:
 CEA (Atomic Energy and Alternative Energies Commission)
 CNRS (French National Centre for Scientific Research)
 Inria (French Institute for Research in Computer Science and Automation)
 INSERM (French Institute of Health and Medical Research)
 Institut des Hautes Études Scientifiques (Institute of Advanced Scientific Studies)
 INRA (French National Institute for Agricultural Sciences)
 ONERA (National Board of Study and Aerospace Research)
 SOLEIL (national synchrotron facility)
 Pascal Institute - University of Paris-Saclay

Academic programs 
Each member school of the Paris-Saclay University organizes training in a given scientific field. Depending on the needs of their registered program, a student enrolled in a particular graduate school will have access to academic resources from other schools.

The various fields of study available at Paris-Saclay University are broadly categorized into the following:
 Biodiversity, Agriculture and Food, Society, Environment (Biodiversité, Agriculture et Alimentation, Société, Environnement) ;
 Biology, Medicine, Pharmaceutical studies (Biologie, Médecine, Pharmacie) ;
 Law, Political Science (Droit et Science Politique) ;
 Humanities (Humanités) ;
 Engineering, Sciences and Information Technologies (Ingénierie, Sciences et Technologies de l'information) ;
 Sport and Human Motion Sciences (Sciences du Sport et du Mouvement Humain) ;
 Basic Sciences (Sciences Fondamentales) ;
 Social Sciences (Sciences Sociales).

The academic programs in each of the 8 schools is expected to follow the Anglo-American model:
Paris-Saclay Undergraduate School – The Bachelor's program is provided by Paris-Saclay faculties and the 2 public universities within Paris-Saclay, which are Versailles-Saint-Quentin University and University of Évry Val-d'Essonne.
Paris-Saclay Graduate Schools –  Master's degrees are taught in both French and English. Altogether, 49 Master's degree are offered.
Paris-Saclay Research or Doctoral Schools – PhD programs are offered through 20 doctoral schools. Doctoral degrees received after September 30, 2015 are awarded under the name "Paris-Saclay University", with a mention of the student's associated university or grande école.

Research programmes 
The Paris-Saclay University gathers together more than 300 research units, organized into 10 doctoral schools:
 Chemistry (Chimie)
 Electrical engineering, optics and electronics (EOE: Ingénierie électrique, optique et électronique)
 Mathematics (Mathématiques)
 Mechanics, energy and physical processes (MEP: Mécanique, énergétique et procédés)
 Subatomic physics and astrophysics (P2I: Physique des deux infinis)
 Wave and matter physics (PHOM: Physique des ondes et de la matière)
 Planetary science and cosmology (SPU: Sciences de la planète et de l'Univers)
 Life sciences (SDV: Sciences de la Vie)
 Human and social sciences (SHS: Sciences de l'Homme et de la Société)
 Information and communication sciences and technologies (STIC: Sciences et technologies de l'information et de la communication).

University rankings 

The Paris-Saclay University has been awarded the 13th world rank in the 2021 Academic Ranking of World Universities (ARWU) ranking. It replaces University of Paris-Sud (Paris XI) in January 2020 which ranked 37 globally in 2019. The same year it also has been awarded the 32nd world rank in the Center for World University Rankings (CWUR).

University Paris-Saclay was included in the 2019 edition of U.S. News & World Report Best Global University Ranking. University Paris-Saclay was ranked 30 globally, 7th in Europe and 1st in France. It was ranked 1st in Europe for physics (5th internationally) and 1st internationally for mathematics.

In the future, the Paris-Saclay cluster is hoped to help France secure a place among the world's top ten universities, and bring French education and research into the limelight.

Nobel and Fields laureates 

Paris-Saclay University formally replaced several pre-existing Parisian universities, grande écoles and research institutes. These continue to exist as departments within the broader structure of Paris-Saclay. The list below therefore includes those pre-2019 laureates whose institutions were later subsumed by the university. We list their institutional affiliation at the time too.

 Jean Bourgain – Professor, IHES – Fields Medal – 1994
 Ngô Bảo Châu – PhD and Professor, Paris-Sud University (IMO) – Fields Medal – 2010
 Alain Connes – Professor, IHES – Fields Medal – 1982
 Hugo Duminil-Copin - Master and Professor, IHES - Fields Medal - 2022 
 Cédric Villani - IHES-University of Lyon Chair - Fields Medal - 2010
 Irène Joliot-Curie and Frédéric Joliot-Curie – Founders of the Orsay Faculty of Sciences, commissioners of the CEA – Nobel in Chemistry – 1935
 Pierre Deligne – PhD and Professor, Paris-Sud University, IHES – Fields Medal – 1978
 Alain Aspect – BA, PhD and Professor, École normale supérieure Paris-Saclay, Institut d'optique Graduate School, Paris-Sud University – Nobel in Physics – 2022
 Albert Fert – Professor, Paris-Sud University (LPS, CNRS/Thales) – Nobel in Physics – 2007
 Pierre-Gilles de Gennes – Professor, CEA, Paris-Sud University (LPS) – Nobel in Physics – 1991
 Alexandre Grothendieck – Professor, IHES – Fields Medal – 1966
 Maxim Kontsevich – Professor – Fields Medal – IHES – 1998
 Laurent Lafforgue – PhD and Professor – Fields Medal – Paris-Sud University, IHES – 2002
 René Thom – Professor, IHES – Fields Medal – 1958
 Wendelin Werner – Professor – Fields Medal – Paris-Sud University (IMO) – 2006
 Jean-Christophe Yoccoz – PhD and Professor, Paris-Sud University – Fields Medal – 1994

See also

 List of medieval universities
 List of public universities in France by academy
Paris-Saclay Medical School
Polytechnic Institute of Paris

References

External links 

 

 
Universities in Paris
Engineering universities and colleges in France
Research institutes in France
Technical universities and colleges in France
Universities in Île-de-France
2015 establishments in France
Educational institutions established in 2015
Universities and colleges formed by merger in France